Molokai: The Story of Father Damien is a 1999 biographical film of Father Damien, a Belgian priest working at the Kalaupapa Leprosy Settlement on the Hawaiian island of Molokai. It was directed by Paul Cox.

Plot
With the coming of more immigrants from Asia, cases of leprosy began to appear around the Hawaiian islands in the late 19th century. As it spreads, a colony for the isolation and care of lepers was established on the isolated Kalaupapa peninsula on the northern side of the island of Molokai. The Hawaiian government, with support from the Catholic and other churches sent almost all lepers to the colony. The Catholic Bishop who is in charge of the place feels a need to send some priests there to administer last rites to people shortly before their deaths. Fr. Damien volunteers and is sent to the island with the caution from the Bishop that he shall not touch any of the patients. Fr. Damien is welcomed at the island by Rudolph Meyer, a man who is a Lutheran who takes care of the provisions sent by the government to the island. The Lutheran points to a mountain and tells him that whoever tries to go beyond it is shot dead to prevent the spread of the disease. On his arrival Damien finds that the little chapel in the island has not been properly taken care of and is ruined. He restores the chapel. With God as his sole help, he starts his work at Molokai. A boy who comes to the chapel volunteers to become the altar boy. The boy is the first person Fr. Damien touches. Near to the chapel Father meets a Protestant Englishman turned a patient who was once a medical assistant in Honolulu (a city in another island). He finds it very difficult to adjust with the church but Fr. Damien's presence is some consolation to him. (He later dies and is buried in the Catholic cemetery). The Bishop who is so considerate relates with Damien's provincial that there is a report about the Father, describing him as 'The Christian Hero' by the prime minister.

Soon a doctor arrives who belongs to Congregational Church and communicates to him that there is a Chinese medicine named Hoang Nan which might be of some help to the patients. The Father with the help of the doctor gives the medicine to some of the patients. During that, Damien informs the doctor about the pathetic conditions of the patients including the sad fate of those who await death in a settlement, only to be replaced by others like them if they are to be found dead on the following day.

Father Damien also relates to him about the stealing and robbery and some of the immoral activities go on there because of their desperate lot who have nothing else to do other than to await their death. A woman friend among others named Malulani is a great help to Fr. Damien although she has romantic feelings toward him which he admonishes. Later the letters Damien sent to his brother become news in the papers and this troubles the authority, especially the prime minister. Father Damien continues his work among the lepers, despite the difficulties with lack of provisions and insufficient funds. When he finds his letters serve no purpose, he pays a visit to the authority which also brings no significant change. The Bishop, who, after finding no one to attend Father Damien's confession, decides to go there himself. However, he is only allowed to give the absolution on board the ship while Father Damien stays on a boat. Damien has gradually developed symptoms of the disease because of his closer caring for the patients.

The doctor leaves Damien as he finds the situation unbearable, and also because he wants to get married. But the doctor's absence is maintained by Brother Joseph Dutton whom Prof. Clifford sent there. One day the crown princess of Hawaii pays a visit promising help to the suffering. The government is however still reluctant to help Damien the way he needs. Once when the weather is not so calm the captain of a ship with lepers orders his crew to toss them to the sea. Father Damien tries desperately to save a few. Meanwhile, his disease develops to worse states and he is still not offered much help. However, a new priest arrives at Molokai to assist him later followed by nuns. Soon the desperate Father succumbs to death with a hope of joining his fellow members in heaven.

Cast 
 David Wenham as Father Damien
 Kate Ceberano as Crown Princess Liliʻuokalani
 Jan Decleir as Bishop Köckerman
 Chris Haywood as Clayton Strawn
 Derek Jacobi as Father Leonor Fouesnel
 Keanu Kapuni-Szasz as Malulani
 Alice Krige as Mother Marianne Cope
 Kris Kristofferson as Rudolph Meyer
 Leo McKern as Bishop Maigret
 Sam Neill as Prime Minister Walter M. Gibson
 Peter O'Toole as William Williamson
 Dirk Roofthooft as Father Louis Lambert Conrardy
 Tom Wilkinson as Brother Joseph Dutton
 Aden Young as Dr. Kalewis
 Kate Agnew as Sister Leopoldina Burns
 Michael W. Perry as Dr. Trousseau

External links
 
 
Molokai at Oz Movies

1999 films
Films set in Hawaii
Films shot in Honolulu
Films directed by Paul Cox
Belgian biographical films
Belgian historical films
Films set in the 19th century
Kalawao County, Hawaii
Leprosy in Hawaii
Cultural depictions of Father Damien
1990s English-language films